The 2010–2011 Israeli Final Four, the sixth Israeli Final Four was held at Yad Eliyahu Arena, Tel Aviv, Israel on 24 and 26 May 2011 to determine the winner of the 2010–2011 Israeli League. The Participating teams are: Maccabi Tel Aviv, Hapoel Gilboa Galil, Hapoel Jerusalem and Maccabi Rishon LeZion.

Venue
The Yad Eliyahu Arena is an indoor sports arena in Tel Aviv, Israel. Opened in 1963 as an open-air venue with a capacity of 5,000, it was covered in 1972, and further renovations since then have brought its current capacity to 11,700. It had hosted the 1971–1972 FIBA European Champions Cup final, the 1993–94 FIBA European Championship Final Four, the 2003–2004 Euroleague Final Four, and all previous Israeli Final Fours.

MVP
Semifinal 1 - Jeremy Pargo
Semifinal 2 - Gal Mekel
Final Four MVP - David Blu

Results

Bracket

Semifinals
All times are in Israel Summer Time.

Semifinal 1

Semifinal 2

Third-place playoff

Final

References

IBA's official website (Hebrew)

1